Glenea fasciata is a species of beetle in the family Cerambycidae. It was described by Johan Christian Fabricius in 1781. It has a wide distribution in Africa. It feeds on Coffea canephora and Theobroma cacao. It contains the varietas Glenea fasciata var. calabarica.

References

fasciata
Beetles described in 1781